The Satellite Award for Best Foreign Language Film is one of the annual Satellite Awards given by the International Press Academy.

Winners and nominees

1990s

2000s

2010s

2020s

Multiple winners 
Only 2 directors have won the award multiple times.

References

External links
 Official website

Foreign Language Film
Film awards for Best Foreign Language Film